Hardin Creek is a stream in the U.S. state of Missouri.

Hardin Creek has the name of Benjamin Hardin, an early settler.

See also
List of rivers of Missouri

References

Rivers of Monroe County, Missouri
Rivers of Randolph County, Missouri
Rivers of Missouri